Geoffrey Charles Hart-Davis (15 September 1905 – 9 December 1941) was a South African first-class cricketer and soldier.

Hart-Davis was born in Lidgetton on 15 September 1905. His two appearances in cricket took place in early December 1927 at the City Oval. Between 30 November and 2 December, Hart-Davis took part in his debut match for Natal against the Marylebone Cricket Club (MCC). In the first inning he was caught by Ernest Tyldesley off the bowling of Greville Stevens after making 6 runs. During the second inning, Hart-Davis caught Herbert Sutcliffe and Stevens off the bowling of Francis Smith and Clifford Tutton respectively. Representing Natal against the MCC between 3-6 December, Hart-Davis caught Percy Holmes off the bowling of Tutton before himself scoring 2 runs.

Hart-Davis served as a private in the Transvaal Scottish during the Second World War. His body was later recovered and interred at the Halfaya Sollum War Cemetery.

References

Citations

Sources
 

1905 births
1941 deaths
Sportspeople from KwaZulu-Natal
South African cricketers
KwaZulu-Natal cricketers
South African military personnel of World War II
South African Army personnel
South African military personnel killed in World War II
South African prisoners of war
World War II prisoners of war held by Germany
Deaths due to shipwreck at sea
Burials at Halfaya Sollum War Cemetery